Dehlaq (also known as Degla and Degleh) is a village in Avarzaman Rural District, Samen District, Malayer County, Hamadan Province, Iran. At the 2006 census, its population was 1,586, in 365 families.

References 

Populated places in Malayer County